Starye Kotlitsy is a rural locality (a village) in Kovarditskoye Rural Settlement, Muromsky District, Vladimir Oblast, Russia. The population was 34 as of 2010. There are 4 streets.

Geography 
Starye Kotlitsy is located 22 km northwest of Murom (the district's administrative centre) by road. Sovanchakovo is the nearest rural locality.

References 

Rural localities in Muromsky District